The Bilca gas field is a natural gas field located in Bilca, Suceava County. It was discovered in 2000 and developed by and Aurelian Oil & Gas. It began production in 2006 and produces natural gas and condensates. The total proven reserves of the Bilca gas field are around 107 billion cubic feet (3 km³), and production is slated to be around 3.7 million cubic feet/day (0.1×105m³) in 2010.

References

Natural gas fields in Romania